Étienne Gouy (born 11 December 1973) is a French former skier. He competed in the Nordic combined event at the 1994 Winter Olympics.

References

External links
 

1973 births
Living people
French male Nordic combined skiers
Olympic Nordic combined skiers of France
Nordic combined skiers at the 1994 Winter Olympics
People from Manosque
Sportspeople from Alpes-de-Haute-Provence